Virginia Mutual Building, also known as the Virginia Trust Company Building, is a historic bank building located in Richmond, Virginia.  It was designed by architect Alfred Bossom and built in 1920–1921.  It is a six level, Classical Revival style building constructed of white granite with terra cotta ornament.  The front facade is in the form of a Roman triumphal arch, reminiscent of the Arch of Titus, with an overall height of 91 feet.  The building is occupied by the Tredegar Trust Company.

It was listed on the National Register of Historic Places in 1977.

References

External links

Bank buildings on the National Register of Historic Places in Virginia
Neoclassical architecture in Virginia
Commercial buildings completed in 1921
Buildings and structures in Richmond, Virginia
National Register of Historic Places in Richmond, Virginia